Yoraxi de los Ángeles Meleán Álvarez (born  in Maracaibo, Venezuela) is a female Venezuelan born, Spanish volleyball player, playing as a setter. She was part of the Spain national team that competed at the 2005 European Championship.

Career
Meleán won with the Venezuelan club Indias Guerreras de Miranda the bronze medal in the 1995 South American Club Championship played in Medellin, Colombia.

After winning the 1998 Central American and Caribbean Games bronze medal with the Venezuela national team, she signed with the Spanish professional club A Pinguela.

On club level she played for Playas de Benidorm for the 2003/04 and 2004/05 season.

2005
For the 2005-06 she signed in mid-August with Spar Tenerife Marichal, that she found unexpected and confessed she found the signing as a big chance to prove her value. Nonetheless, se was expected to be the back-up setter for Romina Lamas. In early August, Meleán played beach volleyball as an ending exhibition in the Torneo de Tamaduste at El Hierro with Tenerife Marichal teammates including Susana Rodríguez and Esther López. With this team she won the 2005 Spanish Supercup in October 2005.

2006
Having won the previous five Spanish Queen's Cup, Melean's Spar Tenerife Marichal won the 2006 season's competition, defeating Hotel Cantur in the final match, even when Tenerife started that match losing 0-7. After that her team won their third consecutive Spanish Superleague defeating Hotel Cantur again 3-0. After winning all the three titles available for the season, and still having the option to play for Tenerife Marichal, Meleán decided to try the Italian League, signing with The Lions Alfieri Volley Santeramo. She said that the lack of chance to play, being the second setter was the main reason of her change, as she have being promised to be the main player in her position.

2016
Meleán won her third consecutive Spanish League with Naturhouse Ciudad de Logroño, when her team won 3-0 the 2015–16 season's final series against Fígaro Peluqueros Haris, ending the season winning the three club awards, the Supercup, the Queen's Cup and the League.

Starting the new season with Naturhouse Ciudad de Logroño, she won the silver medal in the 2016 Spanish Supercup.

2017
With Naturhouse Ciudad de Logroño, she entered as a substitute to help them claim the silver medal in the 2017 Queen's Cup.

She helped Naturhouse Ciudad de Logroño to win their fourth consecutive Spanish title, after having set a league record of 91 consecutive matches won, in a season where she was playing mainly as a substitute player.

She signed with the Portuguese club Clube Kairos from Ponta Delgada, playing the 2017–18 CEV Challenge Cup with this club and falling 1-3 in their first match against the Belgian Hermes Oostende.

Clubs
  Indias Guerreras de Miranda (1995)
  Agrupación Deportiva A Pinguela (1995-2002)
  Visual Home Benidorm (2002-2005)
  Spar Tenerife Marichal (2005-2006)
  Alfieri Santeramo (2006-2007)
  Valeriano Allès Menorca (2007-2012)
  Nuchar Tramek Murillo (2012-2014)
  Naturhouse Ciudad de Logroño (2014-2016)
  CK Ponta Delgada (2017-2018)

Awards

Individuals
 2011–12 Spanish Superliga "Most Valuable Player"
 2014 Spanish Queen Cup "Most Valuable Player"

Clubs
 1995 South American Club Championship –  Bronze medal, with Indias Guerreras de Miranda
 2005 Spanish Supercup -  Champion, with Spar Tenerife Marichal
 2006 Spanish Queen's Cup -  Champion, with Spar Tenerife Marichal
 2005–06 Spanish Superleague -  Champion, with Spar Tenerife Marichal
 2009 Spanish Queen's Cup -  Runner-Up, with Valeriano Allés Menorca Volei
 2009 Spanish Supercup -  Runner-Up, with Valeriano Allés Menorca Volei
 2009–10 Spanish Superleague -  Runner-Up, with Valeriano Allés Menorca Volei
 2011 Spanish Queen's Cup -  Runner-Up, with Valeriano Allés Menorca Volei
 2010–11 Spanish Superleague -  Champion, with Valeriano Allés Menorca Volei
 2011–12 Spanish Superleague -  Champion, with Valeriano Allés Menorca
 2013 Spanish Queen's Cup -  Runner-Up, with Nuchar Tramek Murillo
 2012–13 Spanish Superleague -  Runner-Up, with Nuchar Tramek Murillo
 2013 Spanish Supercup -  Champion, with Embalajes Blanco Tramek Murillo
 2014 Spanish Queen's Cup -  Champion, with Embalajes Blanco Tramek Murillo
 2013–14 Spanish Superleague -  Champion, with Embalajes Blanco Tramek Murillo
 2014 Spanish Supercup -  Champion, with Naturhouse Ciudad de Logroño
 2015 Spanish Queen's Cup -  Champion, with Naturhouse Ciudad de Logroño
 2014–15 Spanish Superleague -  Champion, with Naturhouse Ciudad de Logroño
 2015 Spanish Supercup -  Champion, with Naturhouse Ciudad de Logroño
 2016 Spanish Queen's Cup -  Champion, with Naturhouse Ciudad de Logroño
 2015–16 Spanish Superleague -  Champion, with Naturhouse Ciudad de Logroño
 2016 Spanish Supercup -  Runner-Up, with Naturhouse Ciudad de Logroño
 2017 Spanish Queen's Cup -  Runner-Up, with Naturhouse Ciudad de Logroño
 2016–17 Spanish Superleague -  Champion, with Naturhouse Ciudad de Logroño

References

External links
 CEV Profile
 Burgos Voley Profile

1975 births
Living people
Venezuelan women's volleyball players
Spanish women's volleyball players
Sportspeople from Maracaibo
Central American and Caribbean Games bronze medalists for Venezuela
Competitors at the 1998 Central American and Caribbean Games
Central American and Caribbean Games medalists in volleyball